Occident is an unincorporated community in Jackson Township, Rush County, in the U.S. state of Indiana.

History
Occident was known as Tail Holt until 1882.

A post office was established at Occident in 1882, and remained in operation until it was discontinued in 1900.

Geography

References

Unincorporated communities in Rush County, Indiana
Unincorporated communities in Indiana